Bystré may refer to:

Czech Republic 

 Bystré (Rychnov nad Kněžnou District)
 Bystré (Svitavy District)

Slovakia 
 Bystré, Vranov nad Topľou District

See also 
 Bystre (disambiguation)